In probability theory – specifically in the theory of stochastic processes, a stationary sequence is a random sequence whose joint probability distribution is invariant over time.  If a random sequence X j is stationary then the following holds:

 

where F is the joint cumulative distribution function of the random variables in the subscript.

If a sequence is stationary then it is wide-sense stationary.

If a sequence is stationary then it has a constant mean (which may not be finite):

See also
Stationary process

References
 Probability and Random Processes with Application to Signal Processing: Third Edition by Henry Stark and John W. Woods. Prentice-Hall, 2002.

Sequences and series
Time series